Drohi is a 1948 Telugu-language drama film directed by L. V. Prasad. This was the debut film for Pendyala Nageswara Rao as music director.

The plot
Saroja (Varalakshmi), daughter of Zamindar Gangadhar Rao (Rallabandi), is an arrogant woman. She loves Raja Rao (Kona Prabhakar Rao), who assists her father in instituting wrong things. He accidentally kills an old man while driving her car. Dr. Prakash (Prakash Rao) provides shelter to his granddaughter Seetha (Lakshmirajyam). Seetha helps Dr. Prakash in his social service activities. Dr. Prakash marries Saroja. Since then she hates Seetha, harasses her and drives her from the hospital. Prakash continues his social service in the village with the help of Seetha. Knowing this, Gangadhar Rao, with the help of Raja Rao, sets village huts on fire. The angry villagers try to attack them. Seetha, with her kindness, convinces and stops them, but during her attempt, succumbs to bullet wounds. Saroja changes her mind and gets her father and Raja Rao arrested. She distributes her riches to the poor people.

Cast
 G. Varalakshmi as Saroja
 Lakshmirajyam as Seeta
 K. S. Prakash Rao	as Dr. Prakash
 Rallabandi Kutumba Rao as Gangadhara Rao
 Kona Prabhakara Rao as Raja Rao
 L. V. Prasad
 Kasturi Siva Rao as Compounder
 Venkumamba
 Surabhi Balasaraswati

Songs
 "Aalakinchandi Babu Alakinchandi"
 "Chakkaligintalu Levaa Chakkani Oohalu Raavaa" (Lyrics: Tapi Dharma Rao; Singer: G. Varalakshmi)
 "Endukee Bratuku" (Lyrics: Tapi Dharma Rao; Singer: K. Jamuna Rani)
 "Idenaa Nee Nyayamu" (Lyrics: Tapi Dharma Rao; Singer: M. S. Ramarao)
 "Poovu Cheri Palumaaru Tiruguchu Paata Paadunadi Emo" (Lyrics: Tapi Dharma Rao; Singers: Ghantasala and G. Varalakshmi)

1970 film
The film Drohi was also made in 1970, directed by K. Bapaiah and starring Jaggayya, Vanisree and S. Varalakshmi.

References

External links
 
 Drohi film review in Roopavani magazine

1948 films
1940s Telugu-language films
Films directed by L. V. Prasad
Indian black-and-white films
Films scored by Pendyala Nageswara Rao
Indian drama films
1948 drama films